Palpita obsolescens is a moth in the family Crambidae. It was described by Inoue in 1997. It is found in Australia, where it has been recorded from Queensland.

References

Moths described in 1997
Palpita
Moths of Australia